Hlinka is a municipality and village in Bruntál District in the Moravian-Silesian Region of the Czech Republic. It has about 200 inhabitants.

Etymology
The name, which is a diminutive form of hlína (i.e. "clay"), is derived from the clay quarrying that took place here. It was first called Glynik, the name Hlinka first appeared in 1389.

Geography
Hlinka is situated in the Osoblažsko microregion on the border of with Poland. The southwestern part lies in the Zlatohorská Highlands, the northeastern part extends into the Opava Hilly Land.

In the northern part is located Velký Pavlovický rybník Nature Reserve with Pavlovický Pond I, which has extraordinary importance as a stop of migratory birds and nesting places of water birds.

History
The first written mention of Hlinka is from 1267. It was an agricultural village that was part of the Osoblaha estate owned by the bishops of Olomouc. In the 16th century, it was acquired by Lords of Vrbno, who sold it to the Sedlnický of Choltice family at the end of the 16th century. After the properties of the family were confiscated in 1622 for their participation in the Bohemian Revolt, it was joined to the Dívčí Hrad estate and shared its owners and destinies.

Sights
The Church of Saint Valentine is a small rural church built in 1813. The bell dates from 1780.

References

External links

Villages in Bruntál District